The Ferrari 250 GTO is a GT car produced by Ferrari from 1962 to 1964 for homologation into the FIA's Group 3 Grand Touring Car category. It was powered by Ferrari's Tipo 168/62 Colombo V12 engine.

The "250" in its name denotes the displacement in cubic centimeters of each of its cylinders; "GTO" stands for Gran Turismo Omologato, Italian for "Grand Touring Homologated."

Just 36 of the 250 GTOs were manufactured between 1962 and 1964. This includes 33 cars with 1962-63 bodywork (Series I) and three with 1964 (Series II) bodywork similar to the Ferrari 250 LM. Four of the older 1962-1963 (Series I) cars were updated in 1964 with Series II bodies.

When new, the 250 GTO cost $18,000 in the United States, with buyers personally approved by Enzo Ferrari and his dealer for North America, Luigi Chinetti. This model has since become highly desired by automobile collectors and sales have repeatedly set price records. The current record for world's most expensive Ferrari was set in June 2018 when a 1963 250 GTO (chassis 4153GT) was sold in a private sale for $70 million.

In 2004, Sports Car International placed the 250 GTO eighth on a list of Top Sports Cars of the 1960s, and nominated it the top sports car of all time. Similarly, Motor Trend Classic placed the 250 GTO first on a list of the "Greatest Ferraris of All Time." Popular Mechanics named it the "Hottest Car of All Time."

Design and development 

The 250 GTO was designed to compete in Group 3 GT racing, where its rivals would include the Shelby Cobra, Jaguar E-Type and Aston Martin DP214. The development of the 250 GTO was headed by chief engineer Giotto Bizzarrini. Although Bizzarrini is usually credited as the designer of the 250 GTO, he and most other Ferrari engineers were fired in 1962 due to a dispute with Enzo Ferrari. Further development of the 250 GTO was overseen by new engineer Mauro Forghieri, who worked with Scaglietti to continue development of the body. The design of the car was a collaborative effort and cannot be ascribed to a single person.

The mechanical aspects of 250 GTO were relatively conservative at the time of its introduction, using engine and chassis components that were proven in earlier competition cars. The chassis of the car was based on that of the 250 GT SWB, with minor differences in frame structure and geometry to reduce weight, stiffen and lower the chassis. The car was built around a hand-welded oval tube frame, incorporating A-arm front suspension, rear live-axle with Watt's linkage, disc brakes, and Borrani wire wheels. The engine was the race-proven Tipo 168/62 Comp. V12 as used in the 250 Testa Rossa Le Mans winner. The gearbox was a new 5-speed unit with Porsche-type synchromesh.

Bizzarrini focused his design effort on the car's aerodynamics in an attempt to improve top speed and stability. The body design was informed by wind tunnel testing at Pisa University as well as road and track testing with several prototypes. The resulting all-aluminium bodywork had a long, low nose, small radiator inlet, and distinctive air intakes on the nose with removable covers. Early testing resulted in the addition of a rear spoiler. The underside of the car was covered by a belly pan and had an additional spoiler underneath formed by the fuel tank cover. The aerodynamic design of the 250 GTO was a major technical innovation compared to previous Ferrari GT cars, and in line with contemporary developments by manufacturers such as Lotus. The bodies were constructed by Scaglietti, with the exception of early prototypes with bodies constructed in-house by Ferrari or by Pininfarina (in the case of s/n 2643 GT). Cars were produced in many colours, with the most famous being the bright red "Rosso Cina".

The minimalist interior of a 250 GTO reflects the car's racing intentions. There is no speedometer, seats are cloth-upholstered, and neither carpeting nor a headliner was installed. Cockpit ventilation is via exterior air inlets. The exposed metal gate defining the shift pattern became a Ferrari tradition maintained in production models until replaced by steering column-mounted paddle shifters in the 2000s.

Prototypes 
As the 250 GTO was heavily derived from the earlier 250 GT Berlinetta SWB, Ferrari engineers constructed two 250 GTO prototypes in 1961 by converting existing chassis of this type. 

The first prototype, designated in official photos as the 1961 Ferrari 250 GT Le Mans Berlinetta Sperimentale, was constructed from chassis 2643GT, originally a 1961 250 GT SWB. It was built to competition specification, which included a reinforced chassis, a competition gearbox and a Tipo 168/61 3.0 L engine tuned to 300 bhp, equipped with dry sump lubrication and six Weber 38 DCN carburetors. Pininfarina constructed a new lightweight aluminium alloy body for this prototype, which resembled that of the 400 Super America coupe. 2643GT was entered by Scuderia Ferrari in the 1961 24 hours of Le Mans, driven by Fernand Tavano and Giancarlo Baghetti. Although they were running as high as 8th overall, they were forced to retire at 4:45 am on Sunday morning due to engine failure. During the course of the race, Ferrari engineers gathered information about the performance of the car which was used to modify and improve it, including the addition of a rear spoiler. During the Le Mans race, 2643GT suffered from high-speed instability, possibly due to the front end design. Following Le Mans, 2643GT returned to the factory, where it was used for more testing. The prototype raced again at the 1962 Daytona Continental 3 hours, where it placed 4th overall and 1st in the GT class driven by Stirling Moss. Subsequently, it was sold to N.A.R.T. and a succession of private owners.

The second prototype was also constructed from a donor car, although sources disagree on the chassis number and type. Several older sources mention the donor as a 1960 250 GT SWB, chassis 2053GT. Alternatively, other sources have claimed that a 250 GT Boano (0523GT) or a 1959 250 GT SWB (1791GT) was used as the donor car. This prototype was created entirely by the Ferrari factory's racing department under the oversight of Giotto Bizzarrini, including the bodywork. The original chassis was extensively modified, including relocation of the engine mounts lower and further back in the frame. A competition-specification engine was fitted, including six Weber 38 DCN carburetors. The bodywork seen on the second prototype in period photos was rough, unfinished aluminium. The body's ungainly appearance lead the Ferrari team to nickname it "Il Mostro" (the Monster) and the press to call it "The Anteater." Hammer marks, weld beads and bolted or riveted panels could be seen throughout, evidence of the continual modifications performed during factory testing in 1961. Although the body was crudely formed, it displayed features that would be seen in the production 250 GTO, including the overall profile of a low hood and high rear, triple front air intakes, engine bay cooling slots in the front fenders and plexiglass-covered headlights. The interior was hastily constructed and even more minimal than in the production 250 GTO, with scattered instrumentation and a bare aluminium dashboard.

The second prototype was tested at Monza in September 1961 by Stirling Moss. Results were promising, as the prototype was able to lap the circuit faster than a 250 GT SWB. However, the high speed stability issues seen during testing of the first prototype remained. Shortly after this test, construction of the first production 250 GTOs began in late 1961 with chassis 3223GT and 3387GT.

As the prototype was no longer needed for testing, the experimental body was scrapped. Regardless of the identity of the chassis, sources are in agreement that the second GTO prototype was either partially or entirely scrapped and is no longer extant in its 1961 form. If 2053GT was indeed the chassis, it was then given a 250 GT SWB style body and sold to Jacques Swaters. 2053GT crashed during the 1962 Nürburgring 1000 km and was then rebodied by Carrozzeria Sports Cars. Subsequently, 2053GT was totally destroyed in an accident at the 1964 Spa 500km.

Variants and related models
Handbuild production, updates, and repairs throughout each car's competition history result in differences both visible and invisible between individual 250 GTOs.  Variance in air intake/vent configuration is common among cars. Modifications to the original bodywork were performed by the factory, Scaglietti, or other body shops, usually after crashes or according to a racing team's wishes.

In 1964, Ferrari tasked Mauro Forghieri and Mike Parkes with redesigning the 250 GTO's bodywork, resulting in what became known as the GTO '64 (or Series II). Three new cars were produced to the 1964 specification, and four earlier 250 GTOs were retrofitted to it by the factory. This redesign was intended to maintain the GTO's competitiveness for one more year, as the FIA decided to not approve the 250 LM for GT-class racing during the 1964 season. The Ferrari engineers incorporated many of the 250LM's aerodynamic features into the 1964 GTO. This resulted in a visual similarity between the two models, even though the GTO does not share the 250LM's mid engine rear wheel drive layout. The factory also made minor modifications to the engine, gearbox, chassis, suspension and interior. Despite these changes, the overall performance improvement was slight. The GTO '64 still saw some racing success with factory and privateer teams, including an overall win at Daytona in 1964 by Phil Hill and Pedro Rodriguez driving for NART.

Three 330 GTO specials were made using the 250 GTO chassis and body fitted with 400 Superamerica 4.0-liter motors. Distinguished by a larger bonnet bulge, these cars were used briefly for racing and testing by Scuderia Ferrari before being sold to private customers. Some sources include these cars in the total number of 250 GTOs produced, increasing that number from 36 to 39. 

The 330 LMB is sometimes considered a GTO variant. These cars used a 4.0-liter 330 motor and a modified 250 GT Lusso chassis/body. Four were produced in 1963.

Three 275 GTB/C Speciales were built in 1964/65. Despite their origins as competition versions of the 275 GTB, they are sometimes considered developments of the 250 GTO due to similarity of configuration and bodywork.

The Ferrari 250 GT SWB Breadvan was a one-off racing car designed for Scuderia Serenissima by Bizzarrini after his departure from Ferrari. It was developed specifically to compete against the then-new 250 GTO. Although based on the earlier 250 GT SWB, the Breadvan provided an opportunity for Bizzarrini to develop the ideas he had first explored with the GTO, such as lower and more aerodynamic bodywork, incorporation of a dry sump, and radical lightening of the entire car.

Racing 

The 250 GTO's racing debut was at the 1962 12 Hours of Sebring, driven by American Phil Hill (the Formula One World Driving Champion at the time) and Belgian Olivier Gendebien. Although originally annoyed that they were driving a GT-class car instead of one of the full-race 250 Testa Rossas competing in the prototype class, the experienced pair impressed themselves (and everyone else) by finishing second overall behind the Testa Rossa of Bonnier and Scarfiotti.

Ferrari would go on to win the over 2000cc class of the FIA's International Championship for GT Manufacturers in 1962, 1963, and 1964, the 250 GTO being raced in each of those years. 250 GTOs also won the 1963 and 1964 Tour de France Automobile, marking Ferrari's nine year dominance of that race.

During the 1962-1964 racing seasons, only a few other GT-class models were consistently competitive with the 250 GTO. These were the Jaguar E-type, Aston Martin DB4 GT Zagato, DP212, DP214, and DP215, and the AC Cobras. In addition to official Scuderia Ferrari entries, many 250 GTOs were also raced by independent racing teams and private drivers. During this time it was therefore common for 250 GTO drivers to compete against other 250 GTOs. The 250 GTO was one of the last front-engined cars to remain competitive at the top level of sports car racing.

The 250 GTO gradually passed into obsolescence following the 1964 season.  Scuderia Ferrari withdrew the 250 GTO from its racing activity by 1965, leaving only a few independent teams and private owners to campaign it in endurance races, rallies and hillclimbs. By 1967, the 250 GTO was almost entirely absent from international racing, with only a few rally and hillclimb results during that year. Prior to the development of the 250 GTO collector market and associated vintage racing and show events, some of the surviving 250 GTOs were used in regional races, while others were used as road cars.

Homologation 
FIA regulations in 1962 required at least one hundred examples of a car to be built in order for it to be homologated for Group 3 Grand Touring Car racing.  Ferrari built only 36 250 GTOs (33 of the 1962-design Series I cars and three 1964-design Series II cars, with revised bodywork). The additional three "330 GTO" cars with the four-litre 330 engine —recognizable by the large hump on the bonnet— are sometimes included in the overall production number, bringing the total to 39. It became a popular myth that when FIA inspectors showed up to confirm that 100 examples had been built, Enzo Ferrari shuffled the same cars between different locations, thus giving the impression that the full complement of 100 cars was present. In reality, no deception was required, as the production of the 250 GTO was covered by the homologation of the earlier 250 GT Berlinetta SWB model. These homologation papers were issued in 1960, but extensions were applied for and accepted multiple times between 1961 to 1964, allowing Ferrari to add modifications not covered under the original specification, including changes to the engine, transmission, and suspension. Additionally, since more than 100 bodies had been built according to the earlier 250 GT SWB specification, FIA regulations allowed a new body to be designed, leading to the development of the new 250 GTO body style. This method of homologation was not unique to Ferrari, as similar methods were used to homologate the Aston Martin DB4 GT Zagato and the Jaguar E-Type Lightweight.

Collectibility 
While the GTO is now arguably the most valuable collector car in the world, it was merely a no-frills used race car in the late 1960s and very early 1970s. Many of the vehicles were offered at or acquired for four-figure (USD) sums. In contrast, restored Duesenberg Model J's often sold for about $50,000 around 1970.

From the late 1970s to the late 1980s, classic car values rose rapidly and the 250 GTO became the most valuable Ferrari model, touted as the Ferrari that most completely embodies the characteristics of the manufacturer. Prices fell substantially during the car market crash of the early 1990s, resulting in lows of $2,700,000 in September 1994 and $2,500,000 in May 1996. Prices began to climb again in the late 90s and have continued to rise through the present day. 250 GTOs have repeatedly broken records for most expensive car ever sold at auction or private sale. The current record for world's most expensive Ferrari was set in June 2018 when a 1963 250 GTO (chassis 4153GT) was sold to David MacNeil in a private sale for $70 million. On 25 August 2018, RM Sotheby's sold Greg Whitten's 250 GTO 3413GT at their Monterey auction. The final price inclusive of buyer's fee was $48,405,000, representing a new record for most expensive car ever sold at auction. The previous record was also held by a 250 GTO, 3851GT, which was sold at the Bonhams Quail Lodge auction in 2014.

Scarcity and high prices led to the creation of several replica 250 GTOs on more common Ferrari chassis. Misrepresentations of the original cars, offered for sale at full market value, have been reported.

Price History

Chassis numbers

See also 
 Ferrari 250
 Ferrari 250 GT SWB Breadvan, a 250 SWB modified by Giotto Bizzarrini and Piero Drogo for Giovanni Volpi, in order to challenge the 250 GTO

References 

250 GTO Vin. 3223 GT : https://pbase.com/ferrari250gto/250_gto_vin3223

Damaged 250 GTO : https://pbase.com/ferrari250gto/crash

Bibliography

External links 

A gathering of GTOs for the 45th Anniversary celebration
 Ferrari 250 GTO: Ferrari History

250 GTO
Grand tourers
Rear-wheel-drive vehicles
Cars introduced in 1962